Kaltasy (Qaltası) is a rural locality (a selo) and the administrative center of Kaltasinsky District in the Republic of Bashkortostan, Russia. Population:

References

Notes

Sources

Rural localities in Kaltasinsky District